Egestorf is a municipality in the district of Harburg, in Lower Saxony, Germany.

References

Harburg (district)